Simon Wilcox is a Canadian songwriter based in Los Angeles.

Discography

Selected discography

Full discography

References

External links

Living people
Canadian women rock singers
Canadian women singer-songwriters
Canadian singer-songwriters
Musicians from Hamilton, Ontario
20th-century Canadian women singers
21st-century Canadian women singers
OCAD University alumni
1976 births